Thomas Marble Quarry Houses is a set of three historic homes located in West Whiteland Township, Chester County, Pennsylvania. They are the Quarry Master's House and two worker's houses.  They are all stuccoed stone structures.  The property includes the site of the quarry and vestiges of two lime kilns and ruins from the quarry operation.

It was listed on the National Register of Historic Places in 1984.

References

Quarries in the United States
Houses on the National Register of Historic Places in Pennsylvania
Houses completed in 1833
Houses in Chester County, Pennsylvania
National Register of Historic Places in Chester County, Pennsylvania
Lime kilns in the United States